Ville Saxman (born 15 November 1989) is a Finnish former footballer.

He began his career at home town Kakkonen club FC YPA before joining MYPA of Veikkausliiga in 2010. He also played for RoPS and KuPS in the Finnish premier league before announcing his retirement in November 2020 at the age of 30.

Honours

Individual
Veikkausliiga Team of the Year: 2019

References

External links
 Profile at RoPS 
 Statistics via Guardian Football

1989 births
Living people
Finnish footballers
Myllykosken Pallo −47 players
Rovaniemen Palloseura players
Veikkausliiga players
FC YPA players
Kuopion Palloseura players
Association football midfielders
People from Ylivieska
Sportspeople from North Ostrobothnia